Agostino da Lanzano (died 1410) was a Roman Catholic prelate who served as Bishop of Spoleto (1404-1410), Bishop of Perugia (1390–1404), and Bishop of Penne e Atri (1380–1390).

Biography
On 14 Feb 1380, Agostino da Lanzano was appointed during the papacy of Pope Urban VI as Bishop of Penne e Atri. On 29 Oct 1390, he was appointed during the papacy of Pope Boniface IX as Bishop of Perugia. On 27 Feb 1404, he was appointed during the papacy of Pope Boniface IX as Bishop of Spoleto. He served as Bishop of Spoleto until his death in 1410.

While bishop, he was the principal co-consecrator of Antonio Correr, Bishop of Modon (1407).

References

External links and additional sources
 (Chronology of Bishops) 
 (Chronology of Bishops) 
 (for Chronology of Bishops) 
 (for Chronology of Bishops) 
  (for Chronology of Bishops)  
 (Chronology of Bishops) 

14th-century Italian Roman Catholic bishops
15th-century Italian Roman Catholic bishops
Bishops appointed by Pope Urban VI
Bishops appointed by Pope Boniface IX
Year of birth missing
1410 deaths